

The Berger BX-50 was an experimental helicopter developed by Swiss inventor Hans Berger in 1961. Built largely at home, it was a single-seat design of conventional configuration with a bubble canopy, a two-blade rotor, and skid undercarriage. The upper portion of the canopy could slide to admit the pilot. After a number of test flights, the rotor was replaced with a semi-rigid three-blade design and the skids with tricycle, wheeled undercarriage. Not long after, it was damaged beyond repair and abandoned. In photographs, the registration number HB-XBC is visible, but this was never actually issued by Swiss authorities.

Specifications

References
 
 Aero Revue (March 1964)
 Der Flieger (March 1964)

See also

1960s Swiss sport aircraft
1960s Swiss helicopters
Aircraft first flown in 1961
Single-engined piston helicopters